This is a list of seasons played by Preston North End Football Club in English football, from 1883 (the year of the club's first FA Cup campaign) to the present day. It details the club's achievements in major competitions, and the top scorers for each season.

Seasons

 Seasons spent at Level 1 of football league system: 46
 Seasons spent at Level 2 of football league system: 49
 Seasons spent at Level 3 of football league system: 23
 Seasons spent at Level 4 of football league system: 5

Key

Pld = Matches played
W = Matches won
D = Matches drawn
L = Matches lost
GF = Goals for
GA = Goals against
Pts = Points
Pos = Final position

FL = Football League
Div 1 = Football League First Division
Div 2 = Football League Second Division
Div 3 = Football League Third Division
Div 4 = Football League Fourth Division
Champ = EFL Championship
FLT = EFL Trophy

IR = Intermediate Round
R1 = Round 1
R2 = Round 2
R3 = Round 3
R4 = Round 4
R5 = Round 5
QF = Quarter-finals
SF = Semi-finals
R/U = Runners-up
W= Winners

Colour Key

P = Played
W = Games won
D = Games drawn
L = Games lost
F = Goals for
A = Goals against
Pts = Points
Pos = Final position

Footnotes

Seasons
 
Preston North End